P. Jainulabideen, also known as PJ is an Islamic scholar, teacher and preacher, primarily in the Tamil language and also co-founder of Tamil Nadu Muslim Munnetra Kazagham in 1995. After the political stand of Tamil Nadu Muslim Munnetra Kazhagam he walked out from TMMK and started an Islamic non-profit organization, Tamil Nadu Thowheed Jamath. He is one of the Pioneers in the region who advocated that Quran and Sunnah (Authentic Hadith) as the sole sources of religious authority and oppose everything introduced in Islam after the earliest times. He has been extremely vocal against Terrorism and Dowry among Islamic Community in Tamil Nadu south India.

In May 2018 he was expelled from TNTJ

References

1953 births
Living people
20th-century Muslim theologians
21st-century Muslim theologians
Writers from Tamil Nadu